The 1947–48 NCAA men's ice hockey season began in November 1947 and concluded with the 1948 NCAA Men's Ice Hockey Tournament's championship game on March 20, 1948 at the Broadmoor Ice Palace in Colorado Springs, Colorado. This was the 1st season in which an NCAA ice hockey championship was held and is the 54th year overall where an NCAA school fielded a team. In 1947 there were quasi-official guidelines separating major and minor football programs across the NCAA, but no such determinations had been made for ice hockey teams. Even among the universities that played ice hockey, no such distinctions were even attempted until the mid-1960s. As such, all American universities operating a men's varsity ice hockey program are included here.

As this was the first time a national championship was held, it is considered (unofficially) the first season of NCAA Division I ice hockey since it is the first time that any college teams would have to conform to NCAA regulations regarding recruitment, scholarship, eligibility, etc. The tournament was, itself, born out of a desire to definitively decide the best collegiate team in the country. With only a handful of universities even playing ice hockey (indoor ice rinks were fairly expensive to operate) and even less playing a decent number of games each year only four teams were selected to play in the tournament.

Regular season

Season tournaments

Standings

1948 NCAA Tournament

Note: * denotes overtime period(s)

Player stats

Scoring leaders
The following players led the league in points at the conclusion of the season.

GP = Games played; G = Goals; A = Assists; Pts = Points; PIM = Penalty minutes

Leading goaltenders
The following goaltenders led the league in goals against average at the end of the regular season while playing at least 33% of their team's total minutes.

GP = Games played; Min = Minutes played; W = Wins; L = Losses; OT = Overtime/shootout losses; GA = Goals against; SO = Shutouts; SV% = Save percentage; GAA = Goals against average

Awards

NCAA

References

External links
College Hockey Historical Archives
1947–48 NCAA Standings

 
NCAA